is a small asteroid and Mars trojan orbiting near the  of Mars (60 degrees behind Mars on its orbit).

Discovery, orbit and physical properties
 was first observed on 7 February 2016 by the Catalina Sky Survey; the Pan-STARRS 1 telescope system at Haleakala had imaged this object on 14 January 2016 without identifying it as an asteroid. Its orbit is characterized by low eccentricity (0.059), moderate inclination (23.1°) and a semi-major axis of 1.52 AU. Upon discovery, it was classified as Mars-crosser by the Minor Planet Center. Its orbit is well determined as it is currently (January 2021) based on 131 observations with a data-arc span of 1652 days.  has an absolute magnitude of 19.5 which gives a characteristic diameter of 400 m.

Mars trojan and orbital evolution
Recent calculations indicate that it is a stable  Mars trojan. It may not be a member of the so-called Eureka family.

Mars trojan 
 (leading):
  †
 (trailing):
 5261 Eureka (1990 MB) †
  †
  †

See also

References

Further reading
Three new stable L5 Mars Trojans de la Fuente Marcos, C., de la Fuente Marcos, R. 2013, Monthly Notices of the Royal Astronomical Society: Letters, Vol. 432, Issue 1, pp. 31–35.
Orbital clustering of Martian Trojans: An asteroid family in the inner solar system? Christou, A. A. 2013, Icarus, Vol. 224, Issue 1, pp. 144–153.

External links 
  data at MPC.
 
 

Mars trojans

Minor planet object articles (unnumbered)
20160207